Summerhays is an English surname. Notable people with the surname include:

Bob Summerhays (1927–2017), American football player
Bruce Summerhays (born 1944), American professional golfer and Mormon leader
Daniel Summerhays (born 1983), American professional golfer
Gary Summerhays (born 1950), Canadian professional light heavy/cruiserweight boxer
Jane Summerhays (born 1944), American actress 
R. S. Summerhays (d. 1976), British expert and author in equine matters
Robert R. Summerhays (born 1965), American judge

English-language surnames